DAX1 (dosage-sensitive sex reversal, adrenal hypoplasia critical region, on chromosome X, gene 1) is a nuclear receptor protein that in humans is encoded by the NR0B1 gene (nuclear receptor subfamily 0, group B, member 1). The NR0B1 gene is located on the short (p) arm of the X chromosome between bands Xp21.3 and Xp21.2, from base pair 30,082,120 to base pair 30,087,136.

Function 

This gene encodes a protein that lacks the normal DNA-binding domain contained in other nuclear receptors. The encoded protein acts as a dominant-negative regulator of transcription of other nuclear receptors including steroidogenic factor 1. This protein also functions as an anti-testis gene by acting antagonistically to SRY. Mutations in this gene result in both X-linked congenital adrenal hypoplasia and hypogonadotropic hypogonadism.

DAX1 plays an important role in the normal development of several hormone-producing tissues. These tissues include the adrenal glands above each kidney, the pituitary gland and hypothalamus, which are located in the brain, and the reproductive structures (the testes and ovaries). DAX1 controls the activity of certain genes in the cells that form these tissues during embryonic development. Proteins that control the activity of other genes are known as transcription factors. DAX1 also plays a role in regulating hormone production in these tissues after they have been formed.

Role in disease 

X-linked adrenal hypoplasia congenita is caused by mutations in the NR0B1 gene. More than 90 NR0B1 mutations that cause X-linked adrenal hypoplasia congenita have been identified. Many of these mutations delete all or part of the NR0B1 gene, preventing the production of DAX1 protein. Some mutations cause the production of an abnormally short protein. Other mutations cause a change in one of the building blocks (amino acids) of DAX1. These mutations are thought to result in a misshapen, nonfunctional protein. Loss of DAX1 function leads to adrenal insufficiency and hypogonadotropic hypogonadism, which are the main characteristics of this disorder.

Duplication of genetic material on the X chromosome in the region that contains the NR0B1 gene can cause a condition called dosage-sensitive sex reversal. The extra copy of the NR0B1 gene prevents the formation of male reproductive tissues. People who have this duplication usually appear to be female, but are genetically male with both an X and a Y chromosome.

In some cases, genetic material is deleted from the X chromosome in a region that contains several genes, including NR0B1. This deletion results in a condition called adrenal hypoplasia congenita with complex glycerol kinase deficiency. In addition to the signs and symptoms of adrenal hypoplasia congenita, individuals with this condition may have elevated levels of lipids in their blood and urine and may have problems regulating blood sugar levels. In rare cases, the amount of genetic material deleted is even more extensive and affected individuals also have Duchenne muscular dystrophy.

Interactions 

DAX1 has been shown to interact with:
 COPS2,
 NRIP1,
 Steroidogenic factor 1, and
 SREBF1.

References

Further reading

External links 
  GeneReviews/NCBI/NIH/UW entry on 46,XY Disorder of Sex Development and 46,XY Complete Gonadal Dysgenesis
 OMIM entries on 46,XY Disorder of Sex Development and 46,XY Complete Gonadal Dysgenesis
  GeneReviews/NIH/NCBI/UW entry on X-Linked Adrenal Hypoplasia Congenita including Complex Glycerol Kinase Deficiency
 GeneCard for NR0B1

Transcription factors